The girls' slopestyle event in snowboarding at the 2020 Winter Youth  Olympics took place on 18 January at the Leysin Park & Pipe.

Qualification
The qualification was started at 09:30.

Final
The final was started at 13:55.

References

Girls' slopestyle